D600 may refer to:

 Nikon D600, a full-frame digital single-lens reflex camera
 Samsung SGH-D600, a mobile phone
 Dell Latitude D600, a laptop computer